Hüttlingen-Mettendorf railway station is a railway station in the Swiss canton of Thurgau and municipality of Hüttlingen. The station is located on the Winterthur–Romanshorn railway line. It is an intermediate stop on Zurich S-Bahn services S24 and S30.

References 

Railway stations in the canton of Thurgau
Swiss Federal Railways stations